Ederville was an unincorporated community in Tarrant County, located in the U.S. state of Texas. It is now within the city of Fort Worth.

References

Unincorporated communities in Tarrant County, Texas
Unincorporated communities in Texas